Guo Zhendong (born 4 August 1984) is a badminton player from China. , he (along with his partner Xu Chen) was ranked within the top 10 male badminton doubles teams in the world. He competed at the 2008 and 2012 Olympic Games.

Career 
A men's doubles specialist, Guo has played on the world circuit since 2005, mainly in partnership with Xie Zhongbo. They have won the 2004 Polish Open, the 2005 China Masters and the 2008 India Open titles together, and Guo won the Austrian International title in 2007 with He Hanbin. Guo and Xie were quarterfinalists at the 2007 BWF World Championships. At the 2008 Olympics in Beijing they lost a tight round of 16 duel to the eventual gold medalists, Markis Kido and Hendra Setiawan of Indonesia. Guo is a member of China's world champion Thomas Cup (men's international) team.

Achievements

BWF World Championships 
Men's doubles

World Cup 
Men's doubles

Asian Championships 
Men's doubles

World Junior Championships 
Mixed doubles

BWF Superseries 
The BWF Superseries, launched on 14 December 2006 and implemented in 2007, is a series of elite badminton tournaments, sanctioned by Badminton World Federation (BWF). BWF Superseries has two level such as Superseries and Superseries Premier. A season of Superseries features twelve tournaments around the world, which introduced since 2011, with successful players invited to the Superseries Finals held at the year end.

Men's doubles

  BWF Superseries Finals tournament
  BWF Superseries Premier tournament
  BWF Superseries tournament

BWF Grand Prix 
The BWF Grand Prix has two levels, the BWF Grand Prix and Grand Prix Gold. It is a series of badminton tournaments sanctioned by the Badminton World Federation (BWF) since 2007. The World Badminton Grand Prix has been sanctioned by the International Badminton Federation since 1983.

Men's doubles

  BWF Grand Prix Gold tournament
  BWF & IBF Grand Prix tournament

BWF International Challenge/Series
Men's singles

Men's doubles

 BWF International Challenge tournament
 IBF/BWF International Series tournament

References

External links 
 
 

Living people
1984 births
People from Jingzhou
Badminton players from Hubei
Chinese male badminton players
Badminton players at the 2008 Summer Olympics
Badminton players at the 2012 Summer Olympics
Olympic badminton players of China
Asian Games medalists in badminton
Badminton players at the 2006 Asian Games
Badminton players at the 2010 Asian Games
Asian Games gold medalists for China
Medalists at the 2006 Asian Games
Medalists at the 2010 Asian Games
21st-century Chinese people
20th-century Chinese people